Brunton Park is a football stadium and the home of Carlisle United. It is situated in the city of Carlisle and has a certified capacity of 17,949. The ground opened in 1909. Brunton Park's grandstand burned down in 1953 and the stadium flooded completely in 2005 and again in 2015.

Brunton Park is split into four separate stands; Warwick Road End, East Stand, Main (West) Stand and the Petteril End, which remains closed unless exceptionally large crowds are in attendance.

Brunton Park is the largest football stadium in England which is not all-seated. In 2011, Carlisle United announced plans to move away from Brunton Park to a 12,000 capacity all-seater stadium.

Before the 2012–13 season Cumbria County Council inspected Brunton Park and they deemed that certain areas of the stadium were unsafe. As a result, they reduced the capacity to 17,001 for the forthcoming season.

History 
In 1904 Shaddongate United became Carlisle United F.C., an association football club who played at the Millholme Bank ground to the west of Carlisle. The ground was often too small for their purposes and they sometimes used the Rugby Ground which would later be the adjacent neighbour of Brunton Park. In 1905 United joined the Lancashire Combination league and required larger facilities so moved to Devonshire Park, a football ground which stood where Trinity School now sits. In 1909 they were evicted from premises by the Duke of Devonshire and moved eastwards to establish Brunton Park, the club's home ever since.

Grandstand fire
In 1953 the original wooden grandstand which sat where the Main Stand now sits was burned to the ground in a fire cause by an electrical fault. The sale of local player Geoff Twentyman to Liverpool for £12,500 enabled the club to rebuild the stadium into what is the West Stand today.

Flooding
2005
On the evening of Friday 7 January 2005, the rivers Eden, Caldew and Petteril burst their banks in Carlisle due to as much as 180mm rainfall landing up stream that day. The worst affected area was Warwick Road, where Brunton Park is situated.

For the following six weeks Carlisle United were forced to play their home games at Christie Park in Morecambe while repair work took place. United were still able, however, to reach the playoffs in the Conference that season and win promotion back into the Football League.

2015

The Stadium was severely flooded following Storm Desmond. It caused the team to play fixtures at Preston's Deepdale Ground, Blackburn's Ewood Park and Blackpool's Bloomfield Road.

Other floods
In November 2009 and November 2015, half the pitch and the match day car park were flooded but the stadium wasn't damaged. The match day car park is flooded a least once every year.

Layout

Paddock / Main (West) Stand

The West Stand, is a 9,000 capacity mixed terraced and seated area. It is regarded as the main stand at Brunton Park and on average receives the highest attendance of home fans. The stand accommodates the club's offices and changing rooms as well as media facilities for radio and television coverage.

The lower tier is mainly a paddock terrace which runs the length of the pitch. The home and away dugouts are situated in front of this stand with the tunnel dividing it through the centre. To the north is an area for disabled supporters

The upper tier is known as the family stand with a small section to the south known as the 'A' Stand which houses school children. The full extent of the upper tier is seated and is the location of the stadium's most recent improvements, upgraded seating which was bought from Darlington in 2006 during the club's move.

At the north end of the stand is also a viewing gallery positioned in-between the two tiers of the stand. The gallery sits in front of Foxy's restaurant which offers hospitality packages to supporters.

Warwick Road End

The most distinctive of the four stands at Brunton Park, a unique covered terrace with a triple triangle roof, it is situated at the southern end of the stadium. Although currently called the 'Newcastle International Airport End' under a sponsorship deal, it is still affectionately known as 'the Warwick' to most Carlisle fans. The stand has a capacity of 8,500 and usually houses the most vocal supporters on match day. In the event low crowds are expected this stand can be closed to the public.

East "Pioneer Foods" Stand
Currently named the 'Pioneer Foods Stand', it is a 7,000 seater single-tiered cantilever stand. Although having been constructed a number of years ago, the club still have not completed the interior of the stand, thus the spaces at the top of the stand for executive boxes still stand empty. One peculiar thing fans may have noticed when visiting the ground is that the stand actually runs 20 yards past the goal line at the northern end of the pitch. This is because the club had erected the stand with a view of moving the pitch further northwards so a new stand at the southern end of the ground could also be built. These plans never materialised though, and the problem still stands today.

The north section of the East Stand most commonly houses the away fans, separated from the home fans by nets and a gate in the concourse. When large groups of home fans are expected away fans are sometimes restricted to the Petteril End.

In November 2010 local business and longtime supporters of the club the Stobart Group celebrated their 40th anniversary and bought 4,000 tickets on the East Stand for the League One fixture: Carlisle versus Rochdale. The company then gave away the tickets to the local public. On this occasion the away fans were moved solely to the Petteril End.

Waterworks End

The Petteril is the only other uncovered stand in the ground alongside the lower tier paddock. The stand is a small capacity (3,000) terrace with a small seated area to the east. This stand usually remains closed unless exceptionally large crowds are expected.

To the west of the stand is a small control tower which is used to facilitate crowd supervision on match days. Also located here is the only scoreboard in the stadium and an advertising screen which sometimes displays goal replays.

Premier League pitch

The pitch at Brunton Park currently measures . Originally a soil-based pitch was housed which was built over a landfill site; over the years this caused numerous settlement problems such as dips and crowns. When Bill Shankly joined the club in 1949 he called the ground "a glorified hen coop, everything was in terrible condition except for the pitch and that was always a good one". The pitch was and still is laid with local Solway turf, which is favoured by Wimbledon and formerly Wembley Stadium before its renovation.

During the flooding of January 2005, heavy deposits of silt were left on the playing field and a decision was made by the owners to build a new pitch and install a new primary drainage system.

Other areas

The stadium has on-site parking to the east and north of the ground as well as a smaller parking area to the west. To the north of the ground is a separate pitch which is used for training purposes as well as reserve games.

A club shop is situated south of the ground on Warwick Road. The shop was renovated before reopening after the flooding in 2005, turning over £20,000 on its first day back in business. In front of the shop stands a life-size bronze statue of former player Hugh McIlmoyle.

Other uses

In 1982, Brunton Park hosted a rugby league match between Cumbria and Australia during the Australians' 1982 Kangaroo tour. On their way to their first ever undefeated tour of Great Britain and France, the Kangaroos, who would become known as "The Invincibles", defeated Cumbria 41-2 in front of just 5,748 fans.

In 2007 Brunton Park was transformed into a 20,000 capacity concert venue to host Elton John.

In 2010 Brunton Park was used during the production of the BBC television programme United, a docudrama centring on Manchester United at the time of the Munich air disaster. The ground was chosen due to a likeness in parts of the stadium with 1950s Old Trafford.

Records
Record attendance: (tied) 27,500 Carlisle United–Birmingham City, 5 January 1957, FA Cup 3rd Round 
27,500 (Carlisle United–Middlesbrough, 7 February 1970, FA Cup 5th Round.
Record gate receipts: £146,000 (Carlisle United–Tottenham Hotspur, 30 September 1997, Coca-Cola Cup 2nd Round.

Brunton Park was the first ground to host an FA Cup match between league clubs played under lights. Carlisle United played Darlington in a first round replay, losing 1–3.

Planned developments
By the time of the East Stand's opening in August 1996, plans were afoot to redevelop Brunton Park into a 34,000 capacity all-seater stadium. However, the club's lack of progress on the pitch over the next decade, along with the subsequent departure of ambitious owner Michael Knighton, meant that the stadium remained unchanged from that date.

On 18 November 2011, with Carlisle United established in League One (third tier) for the sixth season, the club announced plans to leave Brunton Park for a new 12,000-seat stadium at Kingmoor in the north of the city. Brunton Park met the criteria set by the Football League for matches in the bottom two tiers of the competition, but would not be suitable for games in the higher levels. The plans came under the slogan "Project Blue Yonder". However, in 2016, Carlisle United announced that the move to a new stadium had been shelved, and that an agreement with a developer to facilitate the project had expired.

Photo gallery

References

External links

Brunton Park Carlisle United F.C.
Brunton Park at PitchMap.co.uk

Carlisle United F.C.
Football venues in England
Sports venues in Cumbria
Defunct rugby league venues in England
Sports venues completed in 1909
English Football League venues
Buildings and structures in Carlisle, Cumbria
1909 establishments in England